1770 is an integer number in the 1000 range that is frequently used to represent MDCCLXX the year 1770 C.E. on the Western Calendar

1770, Seventeen Seventy, or variant thereof, may also refer to:
 1770 BC, the year 1770 before the Common Era of the West
 1770s, the decade in the Common Era of the West
 1770: Ek Sangram, upcoming Indian film
 1770, Queensland, a town in Queensland, Australia
 1770 (mummy), the Egyptian mummy numbered "1770"
 1770 Schlesinger, Asteroid 1770, the 1770th asteroid numbered, discovered as 1967 JR, named asteroid Schlesinger